Mellon Collie and the Infinite Sadness is the third studio album by American alternative rock band the Smashing Pumpkins, released on October 24, 1995, in the United Kingdom and a day later in the United States on Virgin Records. Produced by frontman Billy Corgan with Flood and Alan Moulder, the 28-track album was released as a two-disc CD and triple LP. The album features a wide array of styles.

Propelled by its lead single "Bullet with Butterfly Wings", the album debuted at number one on the US Billboard 200 with first-week sales of 246,500 units. It remains the band's only album to top the Billboard 200. It spawned five more singles—"1979", "Zero", "Tonight, Tonight", the promotional "Muzzle" and "Thirty-Three"—over the course of 1996, and was certified diamond by the RIAA, equivalent to more than 10 million units sold. Lauded by critics for its ambition and scope, Mellon Collie and the Infinite Sadness earned the band seven Grammy Award nominations in 1997, including Album of the Year and Record of the Year ("1979"), as well as nine MTV Music Video Awards nominations, eight of which were for "Tonight, Tonight", including Video of the Year. The songs became hits on mainstream rock and modern rock stations, and "Bullet with Butterfly Wings", "1979", "Tonight, Tonight" and "Thirty-Three" became the band's first Top 40 hits, crossing over to pop radio stations.

Recording sessions saw a wealth of productivity: dozens of fully completed songs were cut from the album and would surface on later releases. A box set released in November 1996 titled The Aeroplane Flies High compiled the promotional singles from the album and featured approximately 30 fully completed songs from the Mellon Collie sessions that had not made the final cut for the album (including one track, "Pastichio Medley", which contained more than 70 short snippets of songs in various states of completion). Both Mellon Collie and The Aeroplane Flies High later saw reissues that included even more tracks from the sessions.

Recording and production 
After the 13-month tour in support of the Smashing Pumpkins' second album Siamese Dream (1993), Billy Corgan immediately began writing songs for the band's next record. From the outset, the band intended the new record to be a double album, partly inspired by the Beatles' self-titled album. Corgan said, "We almost had enough material to make Siamese Dream a double album. With this new album, I really liked the notion that we would create a wider scope in which to put other kinds of material we were writing." Corgan felt that the band's musical approach was running its course, and wanted the band to approach the album as if it were its last. Corgan described the album at the time to the music press as "The Wall for Generation X", a comparison with Pink Floyd's 1979 album, one of the highest-selling and best-known concept albums of all time.

The band decided against working with Butch Vig, who had produced the group's previous albums, and selected Flood and Alan Moulder as coproducers. Corgan explained, "To be completely honest, I think it was a situation where we'd become so close to Butch that it started to work to our disadvantage... I just felt we had to force the situation, sonically, and take ourselves out of normal Pumpkin recording mode. I didn't want to repeat past Pumpkin work."

Flood immediately pushed the band to change its recording practices. Corgan later said, "Flood felt like the band he would see live wasn't really captured on record". In April 1995, the band began recording in a rehearsal space instead of entering the studio straight away. At these sessions, the band recorded rough rhythm tracks with Flood. Although originally designed to create a rough draft for the record, the rehearsal-space sessions yielded much of the new album's rhythm-section parts. Flood also insisted that the band set aside time each day devoted to jamming or songwriting, practices in which the band had never before engaged during recording sessions. Corgan said, "Working like that kept the whole process very interesting—kept it from becoming a grind."

Corgan sought to eliminate the tension that permeated the Siamese Dream recording sessions, about which he said, "[T]o me, the biggest offender was the insidious amounts of time that everyone spends waiting for guitar parts to be overdubbed. There were literally weeks where no one had anything to do but sit and wait." The band countered idleness by using two recording rooms at the same time. This tactic allowed Corgan to develop vocals and song arrangements in one room while recording occurred in the other. During these sessions, Flood and Corgan would work in one room as Moulder, guitarist James Iha and bassist D'arcy Wretzky worked in a second. Iha and Wretzky had much greater roles in the recording of the album as compared to those of the previous albums, as Corgan was rumored to have recorded all the bass and guitar parts himself. Iha commented about the recording sessions:
The big change is that Billy is not being the big 'I do this—I do that'. It's much better. The band arranged a lot of songs for this record, and the song writing process was organic. The circumstances of the last record and the way that we worked was really bad.
Following the rehearsal-space sessions, the band recorded overdubs at the Chicago Recording Company. Pro Tools was used for recording guitar overdubs as well as for post-production electronic looping and sampling. Wretzky also recorded numerous backup vocal parts, but all were cut except that which was recorded for "Beautiful". When the recording sessions concluded, the band had 57 potential songs for inclusion on Mellon Collie. The album was originally planned to have 31 songs, but the count was reduced to 28.

Music 

The songs on Mellon Collie and the Infinite Sadness are intended to work together conceptually, with the two halves of the album representing day and night. Despite this, Corgan has rejected the term concept album to describe it, and it was at the time described as more "loose" and "vague" than were the band's previous records. He also said it is based on "the human condition of mortal sorrow". Corgan aimed the album's message at people between 14 and 24 years of age, hoping "to sum up all the things I felt as a youth but was never able to voice articulately. ... I'm waving goodbye to me in the rear view mirror, tying a knot around my youth and putting it under the bed."

Musically, the album has been described as featuring alternative rock, grunge, alternative metal, art rock and heavy metal. Its sprawling nature resulted in diverse music styles from song to song, contrasting what some critics felt was the "one dimensional flavor" of the previous two albums. A much wider variety of instrumentation is used, such as piano ("Mellon Collie and the Infinite Sadness"), synthesizers and drum loops ("1979"), a live orchestra ("Tonight, Tonight") and even salt shakers and scissors ("Cupid de Locke").

All guitars on the album were tuned down a half-step in order to "make the music a little lower," according to Corgan. On some songs, such as "Jellybelly", the first string was tuned down an additional whole step to C (referred to by Corgan as "the 'grunge tuning'"). There was a greater variety to the number of guitar overdubs utilized than on previous albums. Iha said, "[I]n the past, everything had to be overdubbed and layered—guitar overkill. That wasn't really the train of thought this time, although we did that too." "To Forgive" consists of only one live guitar take, while "Thru the Eyes of Ruby" contains approximately 70 guitar tracks. The various sections of "Porcelina of the Vast Oceans" were recorded at various times, with different instruments and recording setups, and were digitally composited in Pro Tools. Corgan and Iha shared soloing duties; Iha estimated that the guitar solo duties were divided "half and half" on the record.

Corgan has said that "For the solo in 'Fuck You (An Ode to No One),' I played until my fingers saw blood, You can't play a weak guitar solo in such a propulsive song. It's got to be attack-style." He explains this method by saying "... I put on the headphones and stand one foot away from the amp. I turn the amp up so loud that I literally have to play harder than the feedback, because if I stop playing even for an instant, the whole thing explodes."

All but two songs on the album were written by Corgan. The closing track from the first disc, "Take Me Down", was written and sung by Iha, while the album's final track, "Farewell and Goodnight", features lead vocals by all four band members and, according to the BMI database, was written solely by Iha, despite being credited on the album liner notes as being written by both Iha and Corgan. Iha wrote additional songs during the making of the album that did not make the final cut. Corgan said in a 1995 Rolling Stone interview, "[T]here are some B sides that James did that are really good. They just don't fit in the context of the album. And part of me feels bad. But over the seven years we've been together, the least uptight part of the band has been the music."

Packaging and artwork
The artwork and visual design were conceived by Wisconsin-based illustrator and collage artist John Craig, who had spent most of his career taking editorial commissions for magazines. Craig worked from Corgan's scribbled notes and crude sketches, most of which arrived via fax. Craig made other illustrations that appear throughout the album's packaging—animals smoking pipes, celestial bodies with faces, wayward children walking eerie dreamscapes—all with a vaguely antique quality. The woman on the front cover on top of a star is actually a collage made from two paintings: the face was taken from a painting entitled The Souvenir (Fidelity) by Jean-Baptiste Greuze, while the rest of the body was taken from Raphael's portrait of Saint Catherine of Alexandria.

Release, reception and legacy
Mellon Collie and the Infinite Sadness was released on October 24, 1995. The night before, the band played a release-party show at the Riviera Theater in Chicago and took part in a live FM broadcast across the United States. The following week, Mellon Collie and the Infinite Sadness debuted at number one on the Billboard 200, an unusual feat for a double-disc album that cost more than US$20. The album was certified diamond by the Recording Industry Association of America. Originally 5,000 vinyl triple-LP (3xLP) copies were pressed. The vinyl edition has two additional tracks ("Tonite Reprise" and "Infinite Sadness") that are not included in CD and cassette releases. Later repressing resulted in 23,000 pressed but unnumbered copies. In 2012, a remastered four-LP vinyl edition was repressed, with the tracklist order the same as with the original CD and cassette releases, but without the two additional tracks from the original vinyl release.

Critical reception

The album received critical acclaim. Christopher John Farley of Time called the album "the group's most ambitious and accomplished work yet". Farley wrote, "One gets the feeling that the band [...] charged ahead on gut instincts; the sheer scope of the album (28 songs) didn't allow for second-guessing or contrivance." Time selected Mellon Collie and the Infinite Sadness as the best album of the year in its year-end "Best of 1995" list. Entertainment Weekly gave the album an A rating; reviewer David Browne praised the group's ambition and wrote, "Mellon Collie and the Infinite Sadness is more than just the work of a tortured, finicky pop obsessive. Corgan presents himself as one of the last true believers: someone for whom spewing out this much music results in some sort of high art for the ages. He doesn't seem concerned with persistent alterna-rock questions of 'selling out', and good for him: He's aiming for something bigger and all-conquering." IGN gave the album a score of 9.5 out of 10 and said, "As the band's magnum opus it single-handedly changed the face of Alternative Rock. That said, it's not just music, but a work of art." The Music Box gave it all five stars and said, "Indeed, for all its melodramatic self-indulgence, Mellon Collie and the Infinite Sadness is one of the best double albums of new material to be released by anyone in a long time."

Rolling Stone gave the album three out of five stars. Reviewer Jim DeRogatis praised the album as "one of the rare epic rock releases whose bulk is justified in the grooves". DeRogatis noted that "the 28 songs on Mellon Collie and the Infinite Sadness aren't linked by a libretto. They're only connected conceptually through the broad theme of being part of a day in the life of a typical, alienated teen." The writer stated that the album's main flaw was Corgan's lyrics, describing the songwriter as "wallowing in his own misery and grousing about everyone and everything not meeting his expectations." DeRogatis contended that while Mellon Collie and the Infinite Sadness "may even match The Wall in its sonic accomplishments", Corgan's lyrics lacked in comparison. Mojo reviewer Ben Edmunds also praised the music while criticizing Corgan's lyrics. Edmunds wrote, "[Corgan's] lyrics appear to be the repository for the worst aspects of his most treasured influences. He writes with a heavy metal aptitude for wordplay and an inflated prog-rock conviction of its worth, a deadening combination. But there's a sliver of distance in his rage-mongering now that comments as well as expresses." In his Consumer Guide, Village Voice critic Robert Christgau picked "1979" as a "choice cut", indicating "a good song on an album that isn't worth your time or money".

Singles
The album spawned five singles. While Corgan considered issuing "Jellybelly" as the album's first single, he told Chart it was passed over in favor of "Bullet with Butterfly Wings" because "'Bullet's one of those songs where, you know, it's easy to sing along to and [he affects a drawl] ya gotta sell them records." "Bullet with Butterfly Wings" was the Smashing Pumpkins' first single to reach the Top 40 on the Billboard Hot 100, peaking at number 22. "1979", the album's second single, charted at number 12, becoming the band's highest-charting American hit. The "Zero" single was released as an EP with six B-sides. All three of these singles were certified gold by the RIAA. "Tonight, Tonight" and "Thirty-Three", the album's final singles, reached number 36 and number 39 on the Billboard charts, respectively. While it was not commercially released as a single, the song "Muzzle" reached number eight on the Modern Rock Tracks chart and number ten on the Mainstream Rock Tracks chart.

Accolades
Mellon Collie and the Infinite Sadness earned the Smashing Pumpkins nominations in seven categories at the 39th Annual Grammy Awards, the second-highest number of nominations that year. The group was nominated for Album of the Year, Record of the Year ("1979"), Best Alternative Music Performance, Best Rock Performance by a Duo or Group with Vocal ("1979"), Best Hard Rock Performance with Vocal ("Bullet with Butterfly Wings"), Best Pop Instrumental Performance ("Mellon Collie and the Infinite Sadness"), and Best Music Video, Short Form ("Tonight, Tonight"). The band won a single award, for Best Hard Rock Performance with Vocal for "Bullet with Butterfly Wings"; it was the group's first. In 2000 it was voted number 76 in Colin Larkin's All Time Top 1000 Albums. Mellon Collie and the Infinite Sadness also ranked at number 14 on the 1995 Village Voice Pazz & Jop critics' poll, and 487 on Rolling Stone's 2003 list of The 500 Greatest Albums of All Time. On April 1, 2019 Rolling Stone magazine ranked it 26th greatest Grunge album of all time. In 2015, Spin included it in their list of "The 300 Best Albums of 1985–2014". The album was also included in the book 1001 Albums You Must Hear Before You Die.

Track listing
Mellon Collie and the Infinite Sadness was intended as a two-record set. The CD and cassette versions of the album are divided into two discs, entitled Dawn to Dusk and Twilight to Starlight. The vinyl version is divided into three records with six sides, entitled Dawn/Tea Time, Dusk/Twilight, and Midnight/Starlight. The vinyl release also features two bonus songs ("Tonite Reprise" and "Infinite Sadness"), and a completely rearranged track order. In 2012 the album was remastered and re-released as a 6 disc edition, with 3 bonus discs of music and a DVD and also on 4 Vinyl LPs which contained the regular CD track order instead of the original LP order.

All songs written by Billy Corgan, except where noted.

Compact disc/cassette version/2012 vinyl reissue

 Track 8 is listed as simply "An Ode to No One" on original pressings and later reissues.

Original vinyl version
This version adds the tracks "Tonite Reprise" and "Infinite Sadness".

2012 CD/DVD reissue
As part of EMI Music's extensive reissue campaign, a special edition of the album was released on December 4, 2012. The 5-CD disc set consists of 64 bonus tracks of previously unreleased material, demos and alternate versions of Mellon Collie era songs—including full versions of tracks notably featured as parts of the "Pastichio Medley" from the Zero EP—as well as six new mixes of original album songs.

The package also includes a DVD consisting of footage from two live shows: Tracks 1–11 taken from the group's concert of May 15, 1996, at the Brixton Academy in London, England, originally filmed by MTV Europe, and tracks 12–15 from their show of April 7, 1996, at the Philipshalle in Düsseldorf, Germany that was filmed by the German TV show Rockpalast. The bonus content and special features were curated from the band's archives by Corgan and were remastered from the original master tapes by Bob Ludwig. Electronic Dance Music pioneer BT contributed his own interpretation for five songs from the archives for the release.

Personnel

The Smashing Pumpkins
 Jimmy Chamberlin – drums, vocals on "Farewell and Goodnight"
 Billy Corgan – lead vocals, lead and rhythm guitar, piano, keyboards, autoharp, production, mixing, string arrangement on "Tonight, Tonight", art direction and design
 James Iha – rhythm and lead guitar; vocals, mixing, and additional production on "Take Me Down" and "Farewell and Goodnight"
 D'arcy Wretzky – bass guitar, vocals on "Beautiful" and "Farewell and Goodnight"

Additional musicians
 Chicago Symphony Orchestra – orchestra in "Tonight, Tonight"
 Greg Leisz – pedal and lap steel guitar on "Take Me Down"

Technical
 Roger Carpenter – technical assistance
 John Craig – illustration
 Flood – production, mixer
 Andrea Giacobbe – photograph
 Barry Goldberg – additional vocal recording, mixing assistance
 Adam Green – technical assistance
 Dave Kresl – string recording assistance
 Tim "Gooch" Lougee – technical assistance
 Guitar Dave Mannet – technical assistance
 Jeff Moleski – technical assistance
 Alan Moulder – production, mixer
 Frank Olinsky – art direction and design
 Claudine Pontier – recording assistance
 Audrey Riley – string arrangement on "Tonight, Tonight"
 Chris Shepard – recording
 Russ Spice – technical assistance
 Howie Weinberg – mastering
 Bob Ludwig – mastering (2012 remaster)

Charts

Weekly charts

Year-end charts

Decade-end charts

Certifications

See also
List of best-selling albums in the United States

References

1995 albums
Albums produced by Alan Moulder
Albums produced by Billy Corgan
Albums produced by Flood (producer)
Concept albums
The Smashing Pumpkins albums
Virgin Records albums
Grunge albums
Alternative metal albums by American artists
Heavy metal albums by American artists
Art rock albums by American artists